The 1961-62 season was the 70th season in Liverpool F.C.'s existence and their eighth and final season in Division Two. They finished the season as Second Division champions and sealed promotion to the First Division under the management of Bill Shankly, who had been in charge since December 1959. Their top scorer was centre-forward Roger Hunt, who scored 41 goals in the league and 42 in all competitions. They also reached the fifth round of the FA Cup.

The signings of Ron Yeats and Ian St. John in the close season would also be influential in their championship, and would become part of the team for the rest of the decade.

Squad

Goalkeepers
  Jim Furnell
  Bert Slater

Defenders
  Gerry Byrne
  Phil Ferns
  Alan Jones
  John Molyneux
  Ronnie Moran
  Dick White
  Ron Yeats

Midfielders
  Alan A'Court
  Ian Callaghan
  Tommy Leishman
  Kevin Lewis
  Jimmy Melia
  Gordon Milne
  Johnny Morrissey

Forwards
  Gordon Wallace
  Johnny Wheeler
  Alf Arrowsmith
  Willie Carlin
  Bobby Graham
  Roger Hunt
  Ian St. John

Second Division

Table

Results

FA Cup

References
 LFC History.net – 1961-62 season
 Liverweb - 1961-62 Season
 The magnificent 1961/62 promotion season
 The magnificent 1961/62 promotion season

Liverpool F.C. seasons
Liverpool